Anzaur Ardanov (born 4 July 1991) is a Russian judoka.

He is the silver medallist of the 2017 Judo Grand Slam Paris in the -66 kg category.

References

External links
 

1991 births
Living people
Russian male judoka
Universiade medalists in judo
Universiade bronze medalists for Russia
Medalists at the 2015 Summer Universiade
21st-century Russian people